Antiguo Casino Camuyano is a building in downtown Camuy, Puerto Rico, which dates from 1910. It was listed on the U.S. National Register of Historic Places in 1984.

The building was the center of political and social life in Camuy.  It was the first reinforced concrete building in Camuy and its relatively fireproof construction was tested in 1910 and 1927 with fires that consumed much of downtown Camuy.

See also

National Register of Historic Places listings in Camuy, Puerto Rico

References

  

Commercial buildings on the National Register of Historic Places in Puerto Rico
Neoclassical architecture in Puerto Rico
Commercial buildings completed in 1910

Camuy, Puerto Rico
1910 establishments in Puerto Rico